Khan al-Rubu’ also known as Khan al-Nukhaylah, is a historical khan in Iraq located near the city of Karbala. It is around 16km away from the Karbala city center, and situated at the road bound to the city of Najaf. The khan dates back to the Ottoman era, and it was used as a resting place for caravans traveling between the two cities.

In February 2017, the Khan al-Rubu’ cultural festival was inaugurated which lasts for two years.

References

Buildings and structures in Karbala
Rubu
Ottoman caravanserais